Christopher Oliver Bayne (born March 22, 1975) is a former professional American football defensive back. Bayne grew up in Riverside, California.

High school
Bayne attended North High School where he played outside linebacker and running back. Besides football, Bayne was also a member of the track team, performing in the 100 meters and long jump. During his senior year, Bayne was recruited by Arizona, Utah, Nevada, and Pittsburgh.

College
After high school, Bayne attended San Bernardino Valley Junior College. He played safety and recorded seven interceptions in his two-year career. Bayne later attended Fresno State where he majored in Biology. He was moved to outside linebacker his senior year. That same year he recorded 77 tackles and 3 sacks.

NFL
Bayne was drafted in the 7th round (pick #222) of the 1997 NFL Draft by the Atlanta Falcons. During the 1997 preseason, Bayne recorded 10 tackles and 1 interception. Due to this performance he made the 53-man roster. Bayne was released by the Falcons during the 1999 preseason. He was later signed by the Dolphins who released him in the 2000 training camp.

XFL
Bayne was drafted (#76) by the Las Vegas Outlaws of the XFL. He played the nickel position on defense.

Personal
During his short tenure in the XFL, Bayne announced he would like to attend medical school once his career was over. He is the son of Ralph and Deborah Bayne.

References

1975 births
Living people
Atlanta Falcons players
Fresno State Bulldogs football players
Las Vegas Outlaws (XFL) players
Miami Dolphins players
Players of American football from Riverside, California
Scottish Claymores players